The Ochterlony Baronetcy, of Pitforthy or Pitforthie in the County of Angus, and the Ochterlony Baronetcy, of Ochterlony in the County of Forfar, were two titles in the Baronetage of the United Kingdom, both created for Major-General Sir David Ochterlony. The Ochterlony Baronetcy of Pitforthy was created on 7 March 1816, with normal
remainder to the heirs male of his body. The Ochterlony Baronetcy of Ochterlony was created on 8 December 1823 with remainder to Roderick Peregrine Ochterlony and the heirs male of his body. Ochterlony never married (although he had six natural children by at least two of his thirteen concubines), and on his death in 1825 the 1816 creation became extinct. 

He was succeeded in the 1823 creation according to the special remainder by his natural grandson Charles Metcalfe Ochterlony (1817–1891), the son of his only son Roderick Peregrine Ochterlony, of Delhi (1785-d by 1823) by his wife Sarah Nelly, the daughter of Lt. Col. John Nelly of the Bengal Engineers, at Allahabad, India. This creation became extinct on the death of the fifth Baronet in 1964.

Ochterlony baronets, of Pitforthy (1816)
Sir David Ochterlony, 1st Baronet (1758–1825)

Ochterlony baronets, of Ochterlony (1823)

Sir David Ochterlony, 1st Baronet (1758–1825)
Sir Charles Metcalfe Ochterlony, 2nd Baronet (1817–1891); he married a Sarah Tribe of Liverpool, and had issue, including the 3rd Baronet, and a daughter Sarah Helen who married a Foulis baronets.
Sir David Ferguson Ochterlony, 3rd Baronet (1848–1931)
Sir Matthew Montgomerie Ochterlony, 4th Baronet (1880–1946) an architect
Sir Charles Francis Ochterlony, 5th Baronet (1891–1964)

References

Extinct baronetcies in the Baronetage of the United Kingdom
1816 establishments in the United Kingdom
1823 establishments in the United Kingdom
Baronetcies created with special remainders